The men's Greco-Roman 71 kilograms is a competition featured at the 2016 World Wrestling Championships, and was held in Budapest, Hungary on 10 December.

Results

Final

Top half

Bottom half

Repechage

References
Results Book, Page 25

Men's Greco-Roman 71 kg